Surjit Singh Sandhawalia (27 July 1925 – 16 November 2007) was an Indian jurist who served as Chief Justice of the Punjab & Haryana High Court from July 1978 to November 1983. He was the acting Governor of Punjab in February 1983.

Sandhawalia was also the chief Justice of the Patna High Court from 1983 to 1987.

References 

1925 births
2007 deaths
Governors of Punjab, India
Judges of the Punjab and Haryana High Court
Chief Justices of the Punjab and Haryana High Court
Chief Justices of the Patna High Court
20th-century Indian judges